Alexander De Croo (born on 3 November 1975) is a Belgian politician and businessman who has served as the prime minister of Belgium since October 2020.

De Croo was born in Vilvoorde, Flemish Brabant, and studied business engineering at the Vrije Universiteit Brussel before attaining an MBA at Northwestern University in the United States. He worked for Boston Consulting Group before starting his own company, Darts-ip, in 2006. De Croo became involved with the Belgian political party Open Vlaamse Liberalen en Democraten (Open VLD), of which he was chairman from 2009 to 2012. From 2012 to 2020, De Croo served in the governments of Elio Di Rupo, Charles Michel, and Sophie Wilmès as a deputy prime minister of Belgium.

During his tenure as deputy prime minister he served as the Minister of Pensions from 2012 to 2014, as Minister of Development Cooperation from 2014 to 2020, and as Minister of Finance from 2018 to 2020. On 1 October 2020, over a year after the 2019 federal elections, the De Croo Government was formed to replace Wilmès' minority government, with De Croo as prime minister.

Early life and career 
Alexander De Croo was born on 3 November 1975 in Vilvoorde in Flemish Brabant, Belgium, and was one of two children of the politician and Minister of State Herman De Croo and his wife Françoise Desguin.
In 1993, he attended the Vrije Universiteit Brussel where he graduated in 1998 in Business Engineering. He attended Northwestern University in Evanston, Illinois, in 2002, and completed an MBA at the Kellogg School of Management in 2004. Prior to his political career, De Croo became a project leader at Boston Consulting Group in 1999. In 2006 he founded a new company called Darts-ip that specialized in providing services to intellectual property professionals.

Early political career 
In 2009, De Croo participated for the first time in politics, standing in the 2009 European elections. He received more than 47,000 votes. On 26 October, De Croo became a candidate for the presidency of his political party, Open Flemish Liberals and Democrats (Open VLD), to succeed the transitional party president, Guy Verhofstadt. He chose Vincent Van Quickenborne and Patricia Ceysens as his running mates to compete against Marino Keulen and Gwendolyn Rutten. On 12 December, he was elected president in the second round with 11,676 votes; Marino Keulen received 9,614 votes. His election was considered remarkable as he had almost no previous experience as a politician.

Political crisis
Five months after being elected party leader, De Croo threatened to withdraw the Open VLD from the governing coalition if there was no solution to the constitutional dispute in the Brussels-Halle-Vilvoorde voting issue. After Open VLD's deadline passed the party left the government and then Prime Minister Yves Leterme announced the government's resignation. This was accepted by King Albert II on 26 April 2010. During the elections for the Senate in 2010, De Croo obtained more than 301,000 votes, the third most in the Dutch-speaking constituency and served as a senator until 22 October 2012.

Career in government

Part of the Di Rupo government
De Croo succeeded Van Quickenborne in the Di Rupo Government as Deputy Prime Minister and Minister of Pensions on 22 October 2012 after Van Quickenborne resigned to become mayor of Kortrijk. In December Gwendolyn Rutten was elected as the new chairwoman of Open VLD.

Part of the Michel I and II governments
After the 2014 Belgian federal election and its Federal Government formation, it was decided that he would remain Deputy Prime Minister in the newly formed Michel I Government. De Croo also became Minister of Development Cooperation, Digital Agenda, Telecom and Postal Services while Daniel Bacquelaine took over from him as Minister of Pensions. This government took office on 11 October 2014.

During De Croo's time in office, Belgium became the first country to suspend official development assistance to Burundi after the beginning of violent unrest in the African country from 2015. In 2017, De Croo pledged €25 million ($26.81 million) through 2025 to eradicate African sleeping sickness. He also was one of the founders of the She Decides movement, a reaction against the re-installation of the Mexico City Policy by President Donald Trump.

After a disagreement within the government over the UN Global Compact for Migration, the N-VA left the governing coalition, causing the administration to become a minority government on 9 December 2018, known as Michel II. De Croo became Minister of Finance, replacing Johan Van Overtveldt.

In December 2018, De Croo took the stage during the Global Citizen Festival Mandela 100 concert in Johannesburg, South Africa. It was the final event of the international campaign #SheIsEqual for women's rights which attracted €780 million in commitments.

Part of the Wilmès I and II governments
Under the caretaker administration of Prime Minister Sophie Wilmès, he oversaw a financial stimulus package to tackle the COVID-19 crisis and a deal to save Brussels Airlines in 2020. He was elected joint deputy chairman of Open VLD, together with Egbert Lachaert.

Prime Minister
On 23 September 2020, Alexander De Croo and Paul Magnette (PS) were appointed by the King to form a government. On 30 September 2020, it was announced that De Croo would take over the position of prime minister, succeeding Wilmès.

The formation of the Belgian government (Vivaldi) took a considerable amount of time. The book De doodgravers van België by  states that the main reason for the prolonged negotiations was a scandal about communication between De Croo and an Italian pornographic film actress. In August 2021, Corriere della Sera quoted statements by the implicated actress, claiming that De Croo had messaged her seeking a meeting and that they had not met, but had continued to exchange messages.

De Croo's government has a higher proportion of women ministers than any previous Belgian government: half of the ministers are women.

In June 2021, he visited the site of the Antwerp building collapse with King Philippe of Belgium and spoke with emergency workers.

In February 2022, the government adopted a law to make the labour market more flexible: employees will have the possibility, provided that their company agrees, of switching to a four-day week. In return, their working days will be extended to 9.5 hours (corresponding to a 38-hour week). The law also makes working hours between 8 p.m. and midnight more flexible, as they will no longer be considered as night work and will not entitle employees to any compensation

The government wants to increase military spending to 2 per cent of GDP in order to comply with the demands of NATO and the U.S. government, which is causing tension within its coalition. The right-wing supports the plan, but the ecologists are opposed, arguing that the government should have other priorities than the military, while the socialists remain undecided.

On 26 November 2022, De Croo and foreign minister Hadja Lahbib visited Ukraine, meeting president of Ukraine Volodymyr Zelenskyy and pledging continued Belgian support to Ukraine.

Political views and ideology

Like the majority of party leaders in Belgium, De Croo is in favour of greater limits on the political power of the Belgian monarch. He is of the opinion that the monarch's power should be ceremonial, similar to that of other Western European monarchs.

Personal life
De Croo is married to Annik Penders and they have two children. He is a keen equestrian and takes part in a formal event each year together with his father; in 2010 he broke a foot and an elbow when he fell from his horse. He is fluent in Dutch and English, as well as French, the native language of his mother.

Other activities

European Union organizations
 European Investment Bank (EIB), ex-officio member of the Board of Governors (since 2018)
 European Stability Mechanism, member of the Board of Governors (since 2018)

International organizations
 African Development Bank (AfDB), ex-officio member of the Board of Governors
 Asian Development Bank (ADB), ex-officio member of the Board of Governors
 European Bank for Reconstruction and Development (EBRD), ex-officio member of the Board of Governors (since 2018)

Non-profit organizations
 World Economic Forum (WEF), member of the Europe Policy Group (since 2017)

References

External links

|-

|-

|-

|-

1975 births
Living people
Boston Consulting Group people
Vrije Universiteit Brussel alumni
Open Vlaamse Liberalen en Democraten politicians
People from Vilvoorde
Government ministers of Belgium
21st-century Belgian politicians
Finance ministers of Belgium
Prime Ministers of Belgium